William Jacob Busey (born June 15, 1971) is an American actor. Among his most prominent roles have been serial killer Johnny Bartlett in 1996's The Frighteners, Ace Levy in 1997's Starship Troopers, Kyle Brenner in 2001's Tomcats, Aiden Tanner in the 2014–2016 TV series From Dusk till Dawn: The Series, and Sean H. Keyes in the Predator franchise.

Early life
Busey was born in Los Angeles, and raised in Malibu, California, the son of photographer Judy Helkenberg and actor Gary Busey. Busey spent his childhood on film sets and touring with bands in which his father sometimes played, such as Leon Russell, Willie Nelson and Little Feat.

Career
Busey's motion picture debut was in the 1978 film Straight Time with his father Gary and Dustin Hoffman. His two most notable appearances are as the murderous religious fanatic opposite Jodie Foster in Contact and as smart-mouthed soldier Ace Levy in Starship Troopers. He appeared in H. G. Wells' War of the Worlds, one of three 2005 film adaptations of the novel by H. G. Wells, alongside C. Thomas Howell. Additionally, he has had major roles in Tomcats opposite Jerry O'Connell and Shannon Elizabeth, in James Mangold's thriller Identity, with C. Thomas Howell in The Hitcher II, Michael J. Fox in Peter Jackson's The Frighteners and Road House 2. Busey played the role of "Backfire" in Patrick Durham's movie Cross which was released directly to DVD and download in May 2011, and stars in the independent film Don't Pass Me By.

He has also had minor parts in films like Windrunner: A Spirited Journey starring Jason Wiles, Christmas with the Kranks starring Tim Allen, I'll Do Anything, Enemy of the State, The Killing Jar, The Stoned Age, PCU, Fast Sofa with Jennifer Tilly and Natasha Lyonne, and Reaper with Danny Trejo and Vinnie Jones. He also had a main role on the television series Shasta McNasty. Busey portrayed Professor Aiden "Sex Machine" Tanner since 2013 in From Dusk till Dawn: The Series.

He also provided the voice of The Radioman in the 2012 video game Spec Ops: The Line and of the DJ of Resistance Radio in XCOM 2: War of the Chosen. Additionally, he voiced Teenage Tom during flashback scenes in the 1989 film Hider in the House which his father, Gary Busey starred in as Tom Sykes. In 2016, Busey starred in the feature film Deserted.

In 2018, Busey appeared in two episodes of Agents of S.H.I.E.L.D. portraying Mack's old friend Tony Caine. Busey later joined the cast of Stranger Things in the third season portraying a journalist named Bruce.

Personal life
In 2012, he and his girlfriend April Hutchinson had a daughter, Autumn.

Filmography

Film

Television

Video games

References

External links

1971 births
Living people
Male actors from Los Angeles
American male film actors
American male television actors
Crossroads School alumni